Lipovo may refer to:
Lipovo, Montenegro, a village in northern Montenegro
Lipovo, Russia, name of several rural localities in Russia

Serbo-Croatian place names